The United States Census Bureau defines certain unincorporated communities (lacking elected municipal officers and boundaries with legal status) as census-designated places (CDPs) for enumeration in each decennial census. The Census Bureau defined 485 Florida CDPs for the 2000 census and 509 CDPs for the 2010 census. As of the 2020 census, there were 41 new CDPs added and 3 CDPs removed/merged into others for a total of 547.

Note: The table of contents only applies when the list is sorted by CDP name.
Left mouse click on the up/down arrows to sort the list by that column.
If CDP is situated in more than one county, the predominate county is listed first.
Sort by county only applies to the first county listed, if more than one.

See also 
List of Florida counties 
List of municipalities in Florida
List of former municipalities in Florida 
List of places in Florida

References

Censusdesignated
Florida